Haldun Alagaş (November 16, 1970 in Izmit, Turkey) is a Turkish karateka competing in the kumite -70 kg division. He is multiple world and European champion and ranks first at world list in his weight division.

Personal life
Born on November 16, 1970 in Izmit, he completed his primary and high school education in his hometown. Following his graduation from the high school, In 1989, Alagaş enrolled in the Middle East Technical University in  Ankara to study physical education. However, he dropped out already in the first semester at prep school. From 1991 on, he studied physical education and sports at Marmara University in Istanbul, and graduated with a degree.

Haldun Alagaş is married to a music teacher. The couple has a son Emir and a daughter Elif.

Sports career
Inspired by the martial art scenes in Battal Gazi films of Turkish actor Cüneyt Arkın and films of Bruce Lee, he began with karate sport in Izmit in 1982. His first official fight was at the 1986 Turkish Karate Championships, where he became champion in the youth category. He had the red belt.

With gaining success in sports at international level, karate became a lifelong passion and a life style for him.

Alagaş competed between 1994 and 2005 for Istanbul Büyükşehir Belediyespor's newly formed karate team. In 2006, Alagaş transferred to Kocaeli Büyükşehir Belediyesi Kağıt Spor Kulübü in his hometown, where he was until 2010.

Currently, he is coaching karateka in the Kayseri Büyükşehir Belediyespor.

Achievements

Legacy
A multi-purpose indoor sport complex in Ümraniye district of Istanbul, the Haldun Alagaş Sports Hall, is named in honor of him.

References

1970 births
Sportspeople from İzmit
Living people
Turkish male karateka
Marmara University alumni
Istanbul Büyükşehir Belediyespor athletes
Kocaeli Büyükşehir Belediyesi Kağıt Spor athletes
Karate coaches
Turkish sports coaches
European champions for Turkey
20th-century Turkish people
21st-century Turkish people